Habbo is a settlement in Chichaoua Province, Marrakesh-Safi, Morocco.

References 

Populated places in Chichaoua Province